Cabled observatories are seabed oceanographic research platforms connected to the surface by undersea cables.  Such cables supply both power and telecommunications to instruments.  By removing the limitations of undersea power sources and sonar or RF communications, cabled observatories allow persistent study of underwater phenomena. A single cable can support multiple observation sites via individual "drops;" multiple or branching cables may then provide data in 2D or 3D.

The extent of coverage is limited by the high cost of laying dedicated undersea cable.  Initial experiments used abandoned communications cables; efforts are in progress to extend observations at lower cost by accessing more such cables.

Despite their advantages, cabled observatories can (and do) relay compromised data to scientists, particularly when located in remote parts of the ocean. Factors such as instrumental malfunction and biofouling are often responsible for this. Systematic improvements, to lessen the impacts of such factors, are currently being studied by groups such as Ocean Networks Canada.

List of cabled observatories
Monterey Accelerated Research System (MARS)
NEPTUNE
VENUS
Liquid Jungle Lab (LJL) Panama- PLUTO
 (Hawaii-2 Observatory)- early experiment 
ALOHA 
ESONET
FixO3
Ocean Observatories Initiative Cabled Array
Exploration & Remote Instrumentation by Students (ERIS)

See also
Mooring (oceanography)
Benthic lander

References

Oceanography
Oceanographic instrumentation
Submarine communications cables